Melissa Long may refer to:
 Melissa Long (journalist), American television news anchor
 Melissa A. Long, American judge